

The Govăjdia Blast Furnace is a disused blast furnace in Govăjdia village, Ghelari Commune, Hunedoara County, in the Transylvania region of Romania.

An earlier blast furnace had been set up at Toplița in 1781, but the quantity of raw materials it prepared for workshops involved in cast iron refining proved inadequate. Thus, the Thesaurariat at Sibiu, which represented the Imperial Austrian authorities, coordinated mining activities in Transylvania and had an office based in the Hunyad Castle, decided in 1802 to build a second furnace in the Hunedoara area. The site chosen was at the confluence of two rivers close to a group of forge works and iron mines. Construction began in 1806, and although finished in 1810, production only began in April 1813, once the necessary annexes had been built. A tablet placed on the front of the furnace read: Augusto Imperante Francisco Extructum 1810 ("Built 1810 during the reign of the venerable Francis").

The furnace's first period of use was fairly short at seven and a half months, as the crucible had become quite worn and enough cast iron had been generated to last the nearby workshops three years. In all, 1380.3 tons of cast iron were produced. Periods of repair, use and abandonment followed over the ensuing century. In 1837, a fire caused structural damage to the furnace, and an investment of 40,529 florins was approved. On August 25, 1840, an air preheater began operating. In 1841, a narrow gauge railway for transporting ore to the furnace's upper opening was installed. Little wagons would load the ore downward into the furnace; this mechanism replaced the inclined planes used earlier. The cooling systems, the loading mechanism and the continuous production cycle were quite advanced for contemporary Europe. Its most intense period of production took place between 1871 and 1889. Legend holds that metal prepared there as well as at the Reșița works was used for raw material in the building of the Eiffel Tower, but there is no documentary evidence in support of this claim. Activity lessened after 1896 due to the new Hunedoara Steel Works. The final repairs were made in 1914–1916, and the last batch of cast iron came out in 1918. The furnace closed down permanently in 1924.

In 2008, the site was acquired by Ghelari Town Hall because of a failure by Hunedoara Steel Works, the previous owner, to pay taxes on the property. As of 2010, the chimney was intact with the original iron girdles still in place, but the roof was in serious need of repair, and the site was strewn with garbage, although the interior was fairly clean.

See also 
 List of preserved historic blast furnaces

Gallery

Notes

External links 

Historic monuments in Hunedoara County
Industrial buildings completed in 1810
Chimneys in Romania
Blast furnaces